Genital jewellery, also known as sex jewellery and adult jewellery, is jewellery which is designed specifically for wear on or to accentuate the genitals.   In a wider sense also nipple rings and some butt-plugs may be called genital jewellery.

Genital jewellery includes cock rings and vaginal jewellery as well as anal piercings. These items often blur the line between jewellery and sex toys. Genital jewellery is available for men and women and some models may be worn by both sexes. While some genital piercings have been around since at least Victorian times (e.g. Prince Albert piercing jewellery), a recent increase in popularity and social acceptance has resulted in the fusion between function and fashion that is sex jewellery.

The practice is not new, however, with genital piercings, designed to stimulate as well as to decorate, being described as early as 300 in The Kama Sutra.

Wearing genital jewellery in nudist resorts may sometimes be considered inappropriate because it may be seen as overtly sexual (see Issues in social nudity).

See also
 Genital piercing
 Genital tattooing
 Genital torture (disambiguation)
 Nipple shield (jewelry)
 Vajazzle

References

 

de:Piercing#Intimpiercings